Love Point Light was a screw-pile lighthouse in the Chesapeake Bay, off the northern end of Kent Island, Maryland.

History
Local pressure to build a light at this site was noted as early as 1837, but an appropriation in 1857 was insufficient, and it was not until 1872 that a light was constructed, using the same plan as the original Choptank River Light. As with many screw-pile structures, it had several run-ins with ice, with several pilings being damaged in its first winter. It was threatened again in 1879, but escaped further damage.

Automation and dismantling followed the pattern of other screw-pile lights in the bay; it was automated in 1953 and the house removed in 1964, replaced by a small light and fog bell on the old foundation.

References

Love Point Lighthouse, from the Chesapeake Chapter of the United States Lighthouse Society

External links

Lighthouses completed in 1872
Lighthouses in the Chesapeake Bay
Kent Island, Maryland
Lighthouses in Maryland
Transportation buildings and structures in Queen Anne's County, Maryland
Buildings and structures demolished in 1964
1872 establishments in Maryland